AN/SQR-17 is a passive submarine detection system developed by Diagnostic/Retrieval Systems, Inc (now Leonardo S.p.A.) for the US Navy and is still used today. It is a four channel low frequency spectrum analyzer that processes analog sonobuoy audio via a receiver linked to a Light Airborne Multi-Purpose System (LAMPS) helicopter. It at one time was deployed on more ships than any other passive sonar system.

References

Military sonar equipment of the United States